William Tennant may refer to:
William Tennant (poet) (1784–1848), Scottish scholar and poet
William Tennant (Royal Navy officer) (1890–1963), captain of HMS Repulse
William Tennant (United Irishmen) (1759–1832), Ulster Presbyterian banker and revolutionary
Billy Tennant (footballer) (William Tennant; 1865–1927), English footballer

See also 
Sir William Tennant Gairdner (1824–1907), professor of medicine in the University of Glasgow
William Tennent (disambiguation)